Mariusz Witecki (born 10 May 1981) is a Polish former professional road bicycle racer, who rode professionally between 2003 and 2016 for the , , ,  and  teams. He now works as the team manager for UCI Continental team .

Born in Kielce, Witecki won the five-day Course de la Solidarité Olympique stage race in Poland in July 2012, beating 's Bartosz Huzarski by five seconds.

Major results

2003
 9th Paris–Roubaix Espoirs
 10th Grand Prix de la ville de Pérenchies
2004
 1st Memoriał Andrzeja Trochanowskiego
 6th Szlakiem Walk Majora Hubala
 8th Coupe des Carpathes
2005
 4th Szlakiem Walk Majora Hubala
 4th Pomorski Klasyk
 5th Miedzynarodowy 3-Majow Wyscig
 9th Memoriał Henryka Łasaka
2006
 1st  Road race, National Road Championships
 3rd Coupe des Carpathes
 9th Overall Bałtyk–Karkonosze Tour
2007
 9th Giro di Festina
 10th Overall Sachsen Tour
2008
 1st Coupe des Carpathes
 2nd Overall Tour of Małopolska
 4th Overall Tour of Japan
 7th Overall Bałtyk–Karkonosze Tour
1st Stage 6
2009
 1st Overall Szlakiem Grodów Piastowskich
 10th Memoriał Andrzeja Trochanowskiego
2010
 1st Memoriał Henryka Łasaka
 2nd Road race, National Road Championships
2012
 1st Overall Course de la Solidarité Olympique
 1st Overall Memorial Grundmanna I Wizowskiego
 3rd Overall Tour of Małopolska
 8th Overall Dookoła Mazowsza
2013
 4th Coupe des Carpathes
 7th Puchar Ministra Obrony Narodowej
2014
 5th Coupe des Carpathes
2015
 9th Coupe des Carpathes
 10th Overall Course de Solidarność et des Champions Olympiques

References

External links

Bank BGŻ profile

Cycling Quotient profile

Polish male cyclists
1981 births
Living people
Sportspeople from Kielce
Directeur sportifs